{{DISPLAYTITLE:C8H18}}
The molecular formula C8H18 (molar mass: 114.23 g/mol) may refer to:

 Octane (n-octane)
 2-Methylheptane
 3-Methylheptane
 4-Methylheptane
 3-Ethylhexane
 2,2-Dimethylhexane
 2,3-Dimethylhexane
 2,4-Dimethylhexane
 2,5-Dimethylhexane
 3,3-Dimethylhexane
 3,4-Dimethylhexane
 3-Ethyl-2-methylpentane
 3-Ethyl-3-methylpentane
 2,2,3-Trimethylpentane
 2,2,4-Trimethylpentane (isooctane)
 2,3,3-Trimethylpentane
 2,3,4-Trimethylpentane
 2,2,3,3-Tetramethylbutane